Trump Plaza was a hotel and casino on the Boardwalk in Atlantic City, New Jersey, owned by Trump Entertainment Resorts.  Designed by architect Alan Lapidus, it operated from May 14, 1984 until September 16, 2014.

History

The beginning 
The Trump Organization, a company owned by real estate developer Donald Trump, began construction of the casino in June 1982. Harrah's, the gaming unit of Holiday Inn, joined as a partner a month later. Trump would oversee the construction, while Harrah's would operate the property, referred to as Harrah's Boardwalk, after opening.

The property opened as Harrah's at Trump Plaza on May 14, 1984. The complex contained 614 rooms, seven restaurants, a health club, a 750-seat showroom and a  casino, all on a narrow  plot of land next to Caesars Atlantic City. Five months after opening, the name was changed to simply Trump Plaza, to avoid confusion with Harrah's Marina. Part of the reason for this is that Harrah's was commonly associated with and attracted low-rolling gamblers, but Trump had built 85 high-roller suites, which were rarely used. The casino performed poorly, with pre-tax profits of just $144,000 in the first half of 1985. The poor results exacerbated disagreements between Trump and Harrah's, leading to Trump buying out Harrah's interest in the property for $70 million in May 1986.

In 1989, Trump paid $62 million to purchase the neighboring, unfinished Penthouse Boardwalk Hotel and Casino, including a hotel tower that had formerly been a Holiday Inn, and a nearby parking lot. Trump expanded the Plaza onto the Penthouse site, renaming it Trump Plaza Hotel and Casino East Tower. Trump also spent $63 million to purchase the bankrupt Atlantis Casino Hotel, separated from Trump Plaza by the Atlantic City Convention Hall, and rebranded it as the Trump Regency, a hotel annex to the Plaza.

Trump Plaza hosted the WrestleMania IV and WrestleMania V events in 1988 and 1989 respectively. Although the World Wrestling Federation billed the events as being held at Trump Plaza, in reality Trump was only the sponsor of both events, which were held at the Atlantic City Boardwalk Hall. From 1985 to 1998, the hotel was also the onsite host of 19 professional boxing program events.

The casino was the scene of a notorious baccarat session in May 1990, in which the Japanese high roller Akio Kashiwagi lost $10 million. The incident was later fictionalized in Martin Scorsese's film Casino.

Decline 
Trump Plaza's revenues took a sharp decline in 1990, due to competition from its newly opened sister property, the Trump Taj Mahal, which was a mile away. The casino narrowly averted default on a 1991 payment to bondholders by taking out a $25 million mortgage on its parking garage. Trump then negotiated a debt restructuring with the Plaza's creditors, under which their $250 million of debt would be exchanged for $200 million of bonds with a lower interest rate, plus $100 million of preferred stock. The plan was submitted as a prepackaged bankruptcy in March 1992.

Construction of a $42-million expansion began in 1993. The plan called for demolition of the unfinished Penthouse casino, the addition of 30,000 square feet of gaming space, and renovation of the former Holiday Inn building to become Trump Plaza's East Tower, with 361 hotel rooms. The expansion was at the center of a major eminent domain court case, when Trump sought to obtain the property of Vera Coking, a retired homeowner whose house was adjacent to the Penthouse casino. Coking, represented by the Institute for Justice, was victorious, and plans to build a limousine parking lot were thwarted.

In 1995, Trump granted ownership of Trump Plaza to his new publicly traded company, Trump Hotels & Casino Resorts (later Trump Entertainment Resorts). The company also acquired the Trump Regency hotel.

The East Tower opened in two phases, in October 1995 and February 1996. The expansion continued with the May 1996 opening of Trump World's Fair, a $48-million renovation of the Trump Regency with an added casino, connected to Trump Plaza by a loggia across the Atlantic City Convention Hall.

On May 24, 2011, Trump Entertainment Resorts announced that a decision would be made within two months to either sell the casino or to renovate and expand it, possibly with a joint venture partner. In February 2013, the company proposed to sell the property for $20 million to the Meruelo Group, a California-based company whose businesses include the Grand Sierra Resort in Reno. Meruelo planned to make significant investments in the property and rename it. The deal fell through when Carl Icahn, senior lender for Trump Plaza's mortgage, declined to approve the sale for the proposed price.

Closure

On July 12, 2014, it was reported that the Trump Plaza Hotel and Casino would close on September 16, 2014, if a buyer was not found, putting an estimated 1,000 employees out of work. In early August 2014, Donald Trump filed a lawsuit requesting his name be removed from the facility, because it had fallen into disrepair, in violation of the licensing agreement for his name.

Trump Plaza closed permanently on September 16, 2014. This was the fourth Atlantic City casino to close in 2014, after the Atlantic Club, Showboat, and Revel. The closure left approximately 1,300 employees out of work.

Demolition
The building was set to be demolished in the spring of 2018, except for the East Tower and the parking garage. However, on May 29, 2018, the demolition plans had been delayed until at least the following fall due to funding disputes. On December 14, 2018, another demolition deadline passed. Carl Icahn bought the deed to the land Trump Plaza sits on, and terminated the complicated lease on the land that drove potential buyers out in late December 2018. 

On June 11, 2020, Mayor Marty Small Sr. announced that Icahn has submitted plans for the hotel towers to be imploded, as they were considered a danger to public safety because of falling debris. Most of Trump Plaza in Atlantic City was slated to be demolished on January 29, 2021. Atlantic City planned to auction off the right to press the button detonating the explosives, with the proceeds to benefit the Boys & Girls Club of Atlantic City. The auction was cancelled after lawyers for IEP AC Plaza LLC, a subsidiary company of Icahn Enterprises which owns the building, said they were unaware of the fundraiser and demanded it be stopped. The Trump Plaza Hotel and Casino was imploded on February 17, 2021.

Hotel 
Trump Plaza had 906 hotel rooms, and offered five room styles for guests to choose from. There were also several amenities provided to hotel guests, such as a pool and a fitness center.

Rooms and suites 

 Deluxe room: A regular hotel room. Accustomed by two queen-size beds, or one king-side bed. 
 Ocean View suite: The same luxuries as the regular hotel room but with a view of the Ocean. 
 Executive suite: A suite with two bedrooms and a living area as well as the kitchen.
 Contemporary suite: A suite with three bedrooms and a living area as well as the kitchen.
 Penthouse suite: A five bedroom suite with a marble/gold chandelier. Two living rooms, a kitchen, pool-area on the deck, and a statue of Donald John Trump in the foyer.

Amenities 

 Indoor pool
 Spa 
 Salon
 Fitness center

Casino 
Trump Plaza contained 91,181 sq ft (8,471.0 m2) of gaming space and featured standard casino games such as slot machines, video poker, blackjack, poker, craps, roulette, baccarat, and others.

Dining
Trump Plaza had several dining options from which patrons could choose.

Fine dining

 Max's Steakhouse
 Roberto's Ristorante

Casual dining
 24 Central Cafe
 China Cafe
 Evo
 Liquid Bar
 Rainforest Cafe
 Sarah's Cookies
 Buffet (Various Names)
Room Service

Quick service
 Häagen-Dazs
 Nathan's Famous
 Sbarro
 Starbucks Coffee
 Auntie Anne's

Bars and nightclubs
Trump Plaza contained one nightclub, Liquid Bar and Jezebel's, as well as a seasonal bar on the beach named The Beach Bar at Trump Plaza.

Shopping 
There were a few shopping options for those wishing to shop at Trump Plaza.

Stores 

 Landau Jewelers
 Front Page Gift Shop
 Floral services

Events 
SportsBoxing and mixed martial arts matches were held at the casino.

See also
 Gambling in New Jersey
 List of tallest buildings in Atlantic City

References

External links
 Emporis Page

Defunct casinos in Atlantic City, New Jersey
Casino hotels
Donald Trump real estate
Boxing venues in Atlantic City, New Jersey
Mixed martial arts venues in New Jersey
Resorts in New Jersey
Skyscraper hotels in Atlantic City, New Jersey
1984 establishments in New Jersey
Hotels disestablished in 2014
2014 disestablishments in New Jersey
Hotels established in 1984
Hotel buildings completed in 1984
American companies disestablished in 2014
Buildings and structures demolished in 2021
Buildings and structures demolished by controlled implosion
Companies that filed for Chapter 11 bankruptcy in 1992
Companies that filed for Chapter 11 bankruptcy in 2014
Former skyscrapers
Demolished hotels in New Jersey